This is a list of episodes for the Vampire Princess Miyu original video animation and TV series. The original video animation series was released between July 1988 and April 1989, and the TV series aired from October 1997 to March 1998.

Episode list

Original video animation series

Television series

Notes 

Episodes
Vampire Princess Miyu